Austin Krajicek and Rajeev Ram were the defending champions but chose not to participate.

Gero Kretschmer and Alexander Satschko won the title, defeating Santiago González and Mate Pavić 6–3, 4–6, [10–2] in the final.

Seeds

Draw

References
 Main Draw

Jalisco Open - Doubles